Dušan Zinaja (23 October 1893 – 26 September 1948) was a Croatian and Yugoslav cross-country skier and football striker and coach.

Zinaja was born in Budapest (at the time Austria-Hungary).
He was member of the Kingdom of Serbs, Croats and Slovenes team at the inaugural 1924 Winter Olympics in Chamonix where he took part in both cross-country skiing events.

Football career
Zinaja spent his entire career with HAŠK (Croatian Academic & Sports Club). As member of the Kingdom of Serbs, Croats and Slovenes national football team, he has played only once, on 10 June 1923 in Bucharest against Romania.

Zinaja became first player in Yugoslav football history to be appointed a national team coach.

He led national team as coach from 28 September 1924 to 4 November 1925, during which time team of the Kingdom of Serbs, Croats and Slovenes played three matches.

Death
Zinaja died on 26 September 1948 in a traffic accident near the village of Poklek on Mt. Žumberak, near Zagreb, Croatia (at the time FPR Yugoslavia).

References

External links
 
 Olympics at Sports-Reference.com
Player profile on Serbian National Team page
 Olimpics in Croatia, Libera Editio d.o.o., 2007

1893 births
1948 deaths
Sportspeople from Budapest
Association football forwards
Yugoslav footballers
Yugoslavia international footballers
HAŠK players
Yugoslav football managers
Yugoslavia national football team managers
Croatian male cross-country skiers
Yugoslav male cross-country skiers
Olympic cross-country skiers of Yugoslavia
Cross-country skiers at the 1924 Winter Olympics
Road incident deaths in Yugoslavia